Diddillibah is a semi-rural locality in the Sunshine Coast Region, Queensland, Australia.

History 

Its name comes from a local Aboriginal word dhilla, which means "coarse grass" or "carpet snake" and ba, which means "place". Also known as the "valley of the snakes".

Diddillibah Provisional School opened on 14 September 1885. The school building was built by local people led by Richard Heddon. On 1 January 1909, it became Diddillibah State School on 1 January 1909 and the building was given to the Queensland Government. In December 1937, a new school building was officially opened by the local member of parliament Frank Nicklin. The school closed on 14 May 1962. It was located at 664-668 Diddillabah Road. It is now Ash Road Park.

Diddillibah Methodist Church opened circa August 1901. It was at 660 Diddillibah Road. In 1968, the church building was relocated to Coolum Beach.

Diddillibah Community Hall was officially opened on Friday 2 June 1938 by  Frank Nicklin. It is the original school building which became available after the new school was built.

Education 
There are no schools in Diddillibah. The nearest government primary schools are Woombye State School in neighbouring Woombye to the west, Bli Bli State School in neighbouring Bli Bli to the north-east, and Kuluin State School in neighbouring Kuluin to the south-east. The nearest government secondary schools are Maroochydore State High School in neighbouring Maroochydore to the east and Nambour State College in Nambour to the north-west.

Facilities 
Diddilibah Cemetery is off Ash Road.

Kiel Mountain Rural Fire Station is at 670 Diddillibah Road.

Amenities 
Diddillibah Community Hall is at 658 Diddillibah Road.

There are a number of parks in the area:

 Ash Road Bushland Conservation Reserve
 Ash Road Park

 Barry Murridge Memorial Garden

 Brookfield Court Bushland Conservation Reserve

 Bushbird Court Bushland Conservation Reserve

 Campbell Road Natural Amenity Reserve

 Diddillibah Road Environmental Reserve

 Diddillibah Road Natural Amenity

 Diddillibah Road Park

 Melcar Court Bushland Conservation Reserve

 River Gum Drive Bushland Conservation Reserve

 Rose Marie Drive Natural Amenity Reserve

 Schottiana Rainforest Park

References

External links

 

Suburbs of the Sunshine Coast Region
Localities in Queensland